Thomas Waymark (probably born 17 June 1705) was an English professional cricketer in the first half of the 18th century. He is one of the earliest known players on record and is widely accounted the sport's first great all-rounder.

Cricket career

1720s and 1730s
Surviving details of Waymark's career are few but it is known that he began in the 1720s and the earliest definite mention of him is in the 1730 season when a first-class match between the teams of his patron Charles Lennox, 2nd Duke of Richmond and that of Sir William Gage was postponed "on account of Waymark, the Duke's man, being ill". Waymark was last recorded in the 1749 season playing for All-England in a lucrative single wicket contest.

Waymark was initially a groom by trade and was employed as such by his patron, the 2nd Duke of Richmond. There was probably no shortage of capable grooms and it is fair to assume that Richmond employed Waymark because of his outstanding ability with bat and ball, Richmond being the foremost investor in cricket at the time. Richmond's teams were representative of Sussex as a county and the few reports in which Waymark is mentioned make clear that he was the first great all-rounder in the game's history. For example, in the report of Mr Edwin Stead’s XI v Sir William Gage’s XI at Penshurst Park on 28 August 1729, it states that "a groom of the Duke of Richmond signalised himself by extraordinary agility and dexterity". It is generally believed that this was Waymark playing for Gage's XI who won the match by an innings.

1740s
By the 1740s, Waymark was no longer in the Duke's employ as he was working at Bray Mills in Berkshire. He is given as a Berkshire resident and playing for the Berkshire XI or the London XI.

In the 1744 season, Waymark played in both of the two games of which the earliest known scorecards have survived. On 2 June, he played for London versus Slindon at the Artillery Ground. Slindon, backed by his old employer the Duke of Richmond, won by 55 runs. On 18 June, Waymark played for the All-England team against Kent at the Artillery Ground in the match which commences Arthur Haygarth's Scores & Biographies. Kent won by 1 wicket.

Waymark was an outstanding single wicket player and took part in several big money contests. Single wicket was the most lucrative form of cricket in the 1740s. For example, on 16 & 17 September 1748, Waymark teamed up with Robert Colchin to play two doubles matches against Tom Faulkner and Joe Harris at the Artillery Ground. At the time, these four were arguably the best players in England. The matches were played for huge prizes of fifty guineas each. Waymark and Colchin won them both, the first by 12 runs and the second by an unrecorded margin.

The last surviving record of Thomas Waymark is in July 1749 when he was part of an All-England team that played three single wicket "fives" matches against Addington, though Waymark did not play in the third match. He seems to have ceased playing c.1750.

Style and technique
Waymark was a right-handed all-rounder who excelled at both the single wicket and 11-a-side variants of the sport. He was noted (see above) for his "extraordinary agility and dexterity" which would indicate that he was an outstanding fielder in addition to his batting and bowling skills.

Throughout his career, the ball was bowled underarm along the ground at a two-stump wicket. It is believed that Waymark bowled at a fastish pace with variations. He was also an accomplished batsman, though not as highly regarded in this department as his single wicket partner Colchin. The bat was curved like a modern hockey stick and the batsman generally attacked the rolled ball. Batsmen did not develop defensive techniques until the straight bat was invented in response to the pitched delivery, which was introduced in the 1760s, more than a decade after Waymark's career ended.

Family and personal life
Nothing is known of Waymark's family life. He was initially a groom employed by the Duke of Richmond but latterly he was a Berkshire resident employed in some capacity at Bray Mills. Details of his final years are unrecorded and the date and place of his death are unknown.

References
Citations

Bibliography
 
 
 
 
 

1705 births
Year of death missing
Single wicket cricketers